Mamara may refer to:
Mamara, a language also known as Minyanka
mamara, the Hindi name for a type of puffed rice
Mamara, Peru, a town in Apurímac region in Peru.